Varnol(i) Moti (or Moti Varnol) is a village and former Rajput non-salute princely state in Gujarat, western India.

History 
The minor princely state, belonging to the Pandu Mehwas division of Rewa Kantha, was ruled by Rajput Chieftains. 

In 1901 it comprised only the single village, covering 2 square miles, with a population of 168, yielding 409 Rupees state revenue (1903-4, mostly from land), paying 78 Rupees tribute, to the Gaekwar Baroda State.

References

Sources and external links 
 Imperial Gazetteer, on DSAL.UChicago.edu - Rewa Kantha

See also 
 Varnol Mal, neighboring princely state
 Varnoli Nani, neighboring princely state

Princely states of Gujarat
Rajput princely states